Sir Michael Bayldon Barber (born 24 November 1955) is a British former public servant and educationist, best known for serving as Head of the Prime Minister's Delivery Unit under Tony Blair’s government. He was knighted in 2005 for his contributions to improving government. He is the founder and chairman of Delivery Associates, a global advisory firm focussed on working with governments and other public and social impact organisations to help deliver improved outcomes for people around the world.

He has advised governments in over 60 countries on issues of public policy and delivery. He was the founder and first head of the Prime Minister's Delivery Unit under Prime Minister Tony Blair, and later served as Chief Education Advisor at Pearson, and as a partner at McKinsey, where he was head of the global education practice.  He served as Co-Chair of Boston Consulting Group's not-for-profit foundation, Centre for Public Impact and has been a Distinguished Visiting Fellow at the Harvard T.H. Chan School of Public Health and the Harvard Graduate School of Education. He was appointed as the first ever Chair of the Office for Students (OfS) – the new regulator for Higher Education in the UK established in 2018 - until he stepped down in March 2021.

Barber published How to Run a Government: So that Citizens Benefit and Taxpayers Don’t go Crazy in 2015 and his latest book Accomplishment - How to achieve ambitious and challenging things was published by Penguin in 2021.

In 2021, he was asked by the UK Prime Minister and Cabinet Secretary to conduct a rapid review of government delivery to ensure it remains focused, effective and efficient in the rebuild after COVID-19.

In January 2022, Barber was appointed Chancellor of the University of Exeter. In April 2022, Barber was announced as the new chairman of Somerset County Cricket Club.

Education and early career
Barber was born in Liverpool, and educated at Bootham School, York, a private school with a Quaker background and ethos. He read History at the University of Oxford before training as a teacher. He taught in schools in Britain and Zimbabwe.

Barber worked in the education department of the National Union of Teachers. As a member of the Labour Party, he was elected to the council of the London Borough of Hackney, becoming chair of the education committee. In 1987 he contested for Labour the seat of Henley, then held by Michael Heseltine.

Government
Barber served as Chief Adviser to the Secretary of State for Education on School Standards during the first term of British Prime Minister Tony Blair, from 1997 to 2001.

During Blair's second term, from 2001 to 2005, Barber served as the Chief Adviser on Delivery, reporting directly to Prime Minister Tony Blair. As head of the Prime Minister's Delivery Unit (PMDU), he was responsible for working with government agencies to ensure successful implementation of the Prime Minister's priority programs, including those in health, education, transport, policing, the criminal justice system, and asylum/immigration. He wrote a book about his experience in the PMDU. Instruction to Deliver: Fighting to Reform Britain’s Public Services (Methuen 2008),  It was described by the Financial Times as "one of the best books about British Government for many years".

Barber was appointed as the first ever Chair of the Office for Students (OfS) – the regulator for Higher Education in the UK established in 2018 - until he stepped down in March 2021.

Delivery Associates
Barber is the founder and chairman of Delivery Associates, a global advisory firm.

Pakistan 
Barber has served as the co-chair of the Pakistan Education Taskforce, as DFID Special Representative on Education for Pakistan. This work led to the development of the "Punjab Roadmap", with ambitious goals to increase the quality of education offered at all 60,000 schools in the Punjab. The Good News from Pakistan, published in 2013 with Reform, summarises the change achieved between August 2011 and January 2013.

The Independent Commission on Aid Impact has praised the Roadmap as "an excellent example of how a well-designed monitoring system can be integral to the design of a reform programme".

Barber also advised Dr Sania Nishtar, the Special Assistant to the Pakistan Prime Minister on Social Protection and Poverty Alleviation, on the Ehsaas programme in Pakistan.

UK Government 
Barber was asked by the UK Treasury in 2017 to conduct a review into how the government measures impact for each taxpayer pound spent on public services. The Public Value Review set out a practical approach to understanding public sector productivity and how it can be addressed in government.

In 2021, Barber was asked by the Prime Minister and the Cabinet Secretary to review government delivery to ensure it remains focused, effective and efficient in the rebuild after COVID-19.

In November 2022, British Chancellor of the Exchequer Jeremy Hunt announced that Barber would serve in an advisory role to the government on the government's skills reform programme.

At McKinsey and Company
Following his time leading the Prime Minister's Delivery Unit, Barber served as partner and head of McKinsey's Global Education Practice until 2011.  While at McKinsey, Barber co-authored two major education reports: How the world’s most improved school systems keep getting better (2010) and How the world’s best-performing schools come out on top (2007).

During this time, Barber continued to work on management in the public sector, and published Deliverology 101 in 2011 to serve as a comprehensive guide to system reform and delivery. Governments and large public organisations (from the Louisiana school system to the Malaysian government) adopted elements of the 'deliverology' approach.

Education Delivery Institute
In the summer of 2010, Barber teamed with leaders from the Education Trust and Achieve to found the U.S. Education Delivery Institute. Between 2010 and 2016, this Institute worked with leaders of K-12 and higher education systems around the United States to adapt the delivery concept pioneered by Barber in the Prime Minister's Delivery Unit to drive American education reform efforts.

Chief Education Advisor, Pearson
From September 2011 to March 2017, Barber was Chief Education Advisor at Pearson. In this role, he led the company's worldwide research and partnership on education policy and learning methods, advised on the innovation and development of new products and services, and led Pearson's strategy for education in the poorest sectors of the world.

Barber wrote several publications while at Pearson including Oceans of Innovation with Katelyn Donnelly and Saad Rizvi about the rise of Pacific Asia and the implications for global leadership and education, An Avalanche is Coming, again with Katelyn Donnelly and Saad Rizvi, about the upcoming revolution in global higher education. The Incomplete Guide to Delivering Learning Outcomes was co-authored with Saad Rizvi and introduced Pearson's journey towards putting efficacy at the heart of the company, and the lessons learned that anyone passionate about delivering outcomes or transforming a company can apply. Asking More: The Path to Efficacy was edited by Barber and Saad Rizvi, and brought together articles from some of the world's leading education practitioners and business people to highlight the urgent opportunity for a global focus on outcomes in education.

Barber also chaired the Pearson Affordable Learning Fund. Announced in July 2012, The Pearson Affordable Learning Fund (PALF) is a venture fund with $65M of capital that invests in private schools, education technology, and scalable services to meet the demand for affordable education in Africa, Asia, and Latin America. PALF seeks investments with market returns while demonstrating outsized learning outcomes. In 2016, PALF had 10 portfolio companies across 6 countries, averaging 140% revenue growth in that year. The fund's first investment was in an affordable Ghanaian school chain, Omega Schools, headed by Ken Donkoh and Professor James Tooley. In the first four months of the investment, Omega Schools expanded from 10 schools serving 6,000 students to 20 schools serving 11,000.

In November 2012, Barber launched The Learning Curve, commissioned by Pearson from the Economist Intelligence Unit to work with some of the world's leading education experts to review, research, and interview innovators from every continent about how best to achieve better learning outcomes. It established the first ever open and searchable global education data bank - drawing on the world's best existing data-sets including the PISA, TIMMS and PIRLS studies.

Honorary degrees
Barber has been a Distinguished Visiting Fellow at the Harvard T.H. Chan School of Public Health the Harvard Graduate School of Education and is an Honorary Fellow of The Queen's College, Oxford. He was awarded honorary doctorates from the University of Exeter and Nottingham Trent University.

Publications
 Instruction to Deliver
 Deliverology 101: A Field Guide for Educational Leaders
 How the world’s best-performing schools come out on top
 How the world’s most improved school systems keep getting better
 Oceans of Innovation
 An Avalanche is Coming: Higher Education and the Revolution Ahead
 The Incomplete Guide to Delivering Learning Outcomes
 Asking More: The Path to Efficacy
 The Public Sector: Managing the Unmanageable (Contributor)
 Deliverology in Practice
 How to Run a Government: So that Citizens Benefit and Taxpayers Don’t go Crazy
Accomplishment - How to Achieve Ambitious and Challenging Things

References

1955 births
Living people
People educated at Bootham School
Alumni of the University of Oxford
People associated with Nottingham Trent University
British educational theorists
British chief executives
Knights Bachelor
Chancellors of the University of Exeter
People from Liverpool